Piotrkowo may refer to the following places:
Piotrkowo, Kuyavian-Pomeranian Voivodeship (north-central Poland)
Piotrkowo, Iława County in Warmian-Masurian Voivodeship (north Poland)
Piotrkowo, Nidzica County in Warmian-Masurian Voivodeship (north Poland)